Ken Dashow (born May 1, 1958) is a writer, performer and director. He is a disc jockey at New York City's WAXQ "Q104.3" classic rock radio station. He is also voicetracked to Classic Rock WBGG-FM "Big 105.9" in Miami, WPYX PYX106, 106.5 in Albany, NY and to WEGR Rock 103, 102.7 FM in Memphis. Brooklyn born and raised, he has spent the last 30 years in New York radio. He has written several plays, a collection of which was published by Dramatists Play Service entitled Dashow Must Go On, and Rock is Dead which was produced Off-Broadway at the SoHo Playhouse. His screenplays The Naked Detective and Desire have become cult classics.

Early life
Dashow was born in May 1, 1958 as the son of Irving Dashow, a retailer in the garment industry, and Adele Dashow, a Brooklyn community leader. He grew up in Sheepshead Bay.

Radio career

WIXL  (1978 - 1979)
WRCN  (1979 – 1980)
WAPP  (1980 - 1982)
WNEW-FM-AM  (1982 - 1999)
SW NETWORKS - CLASSIC FM,"THE EDGE OF REALITY"  (1997-2000)
WAXQ (Q104.3) (1999–present)
WBGG-FM (105.9 FM Miami-Ft. Lauderdale) (Voicetracked 2009–present)
WRVQ-FM (96.1 FM Richmond, VA) (Voicetracked 2013–present)

References

External links
Ken Dashow - Q104.3 - New York's Classic Rock

Ken Dashow’s off-broadway credits
Ken Dashow images
Ken Dashow - complete guide to the Playwright and the Plays
 DJ page on PYX106 in Albany

American radio DJs
Living people
Radio personalities from New York City
Radio personalities from Miami
People from Sheepshead Bay, Brooklyn
1958 births